The 1999 Saskatchewan Roughriders finished in 4th place in the West Division with a 3–15 record and missed the playoffs. It was their worst record for a season in the current 18-game schedule and their worst since going 2–14 in the 1980 season.

Offseason

CFL draft

Preseason

Regular season

Season standings

Season schedule

Roster

Awards and records

CFL All-Star Selections
None

Western All-Star Selections
Willie Pless, Linebacker
Neal Smith, Defensive End
John Terry, Offensive Tackle

Milestones

References

Saskatchewan Roughriders
Saskatchewan Roughriders seasons
Saskatchewan Roughriders Season, 1999